Acrocercops leucotoma is a moth of the family Gracillariidae. It is known from Queensland, Australia.

References

leucotoma
Moths of Queensland
Moths described in 1913